My Monster Mom is a 2008 comedy-drama film produced and distributed by Regal Films and GMA Pictures. It stars Annabelle Rama as Esme, an abrasive, loudmouth mother, and Ruffa Gutierrez as Abbey, her American-spoken daughter from the United States. Together they go through a series of antics and mishaps that eventually shapes their relationship for the better.

Plot
Esmeralda "Esme" Fajardo, a young, spirited, and ultra-liberal teenager who lives in Cebu goes to Manila to study for college, only to fall in love with a guy named Waldo, a beguiling and charming gentleman (Eddie Gutierrez) who seemingly has the same feelings for her. Her (often clandestine) rendezvous with him eventually resulted in her getting pregnant, which made her stop schooling. Left with no choice, she lives with him under one roof, only to find out that he is cheating on her. After a violent confrontation, she flees and resorts to doing odd jobs to earn money. Several months pass and she soon gives birth to Abbey. But unfortunately, she gives her daughter to her relatives, who were at that time leaving the country and migrating to the United States, in hopes that Abbey will find a better life there. 27 years later, Esme has now become an extraordinarily wealthy jewellery trader. She is turned ecstatic upon hearing that her daughter Abby is coming back to the Philippines as a liberal New Yorker. Esme, now having 2 sons named Boboy and Pipo, both of which were born from two different fathers, welcomes her daughter to her real family. This then leads to violent, often humorous confrontations with other people around Esme and her family, ranging from one of her son's "secret" girlfriend, to her rival neighbor. A couple of months later, after her constant battles with other people finally tears her family apart, but is then reunited when she develops a heart attack -forcing her sons and daughter to forgive their mother for all the trouble she has caused. After several weeks in the hospital, Esme, now fully recovered, though still brash, decides to meet her long lost husband once more. The film ends 3 months later, Abbey is in the United States once again, only to be surprised by her mother, who subsequently follows her and plans to live with her in New York City.

Cast
Ruffa Gutierrez as Abbey Gail Fajardo
Annabelle Rama as Adult Esmeralda Fajardo
Rhian Ramos as Teenage Esmeralda Fajardo
JC de Vera as Boboy
Michelle Madrigal as Maureen
Martin Escudero as Pipo
Iwa Moto as Vivian
Eugene Domingo as Marilou
Richard Gutierrez as Teenage Waldo
Eddie Gutierrez as Adult Waldo
Khryss Adalia as Homer
Chariz Solomon as Precy
Bubbles Paraiso as Karen
Vangie Labalan as Lumeng
Tessie Villarama as Chuchay

References

External links
 

2008 films
Regal Entertainment films
GMA Pictures films
2008 comedy-drama films
2000s Tagalog-language films
Films set in the Philippines
Philippine comedy-drama films
2008 comedy films
2008 drama films